Portland Museum of Modern Art (PMOMA) in Portland, Oregon, was founded in 2012. It is located in the basement of Mississippi Records and was founded by curator Libby Werbel. The Museum is staffed by Mississippi Records employees.

History
At its founding, Werbel called the PMOMA "her fake museum." OPB noted that PMOMA is "a tiny space that wittily challenges ideas about the nature of museums and the art-watching experience." The project has received recognition in Artforum, among others, and has been supported by the Precipice Fund, The Calligram Foundation, The Andy Warhol Foundation for the Visual Arts and the Regional Arts & Culture Council.

In September 2016, PMOMA hosted a residency series, Houseguest, on Pioneer Courthouse Square. The PMOMA showcases contemporary folk art.

References

External links 

 

2012 establishments in Oregon
Art museums established in 2012
Art museums and galleries in Oregon
Museums in Portland, Oregon